Humbertochloa is a genus of African plants in the grass family.

 Species
 Humbertochloa bambusiuscula A.Camus & Stapf - Madagascar
 Humbertochloa greenwayi C.E.Hubb. - Tanzania

References

Poaceae genera
Flora of Africa
Oryzoideae
Taxa named by Aimée Antoinette Camus
Taxa named by Otto Stapf